Musa Yaffa (born 15 July 1994) is a Gambian international footballer who plays for Banjul Hawks, as a defender.

Career
Born in Sutukoba, he has played club football for Bakau United and Banjul Hawks.

He made his international debut for Gambia in 2016.

References

1994 births
Living people
Gambian footballers
The Gambia international footballers
Bakau United FC players
Banjul Hawks FC players
Association football defenders